Forship Engenharia is a Brazilian business group, with significant presence in the Americas, Europe, Asia, and Africa. With strategic focus on commissioning and operability, the group offers engineering and technical consultancy services and products to the oil & natural gas, shipbuilding, petrochemical, energy and mining industries, among others.

History
The company was founded in 1998 by Fabio Fares, who identified the lack of structured methods and tools for the commissioning activity management of complex industrial projects in the country. Its activities have naturally expanded to the energy, petrochemicals, and mining sectors.

In 2006, Forship established an office in Singapore in order to manage Forship Asia operations, supporting the provision of services for the Middle East and Asia market areas.
 
In 2007, the Group was granted ISO 9001 certification in Commissioning Management, by DNV.

In April 2009, the Forship engineering manager, Bruno Montenegro, published an article in the EPC News magazine supporting acknowledgment of Commissioning as an independent discipline of engineering.

In 2008, Forship became an active member of the CE-EPC – Centro de Excelência em EPC, (Brazilian Center of Excellence in EPC), a non-profit entity that gathers operators, EPC companies, service providers, regulatory entities, and universities in order to improve and share the best practices on EPC projects, so that the Brazilian industry in the oil, gas, and energy sectors can become competitive and sustainable.

In 2012, Forship Group established an office in Mozambique, in order to provide commissioning services and develop integrated information technology solutions, initially focusing on the mining and infrastructure sectors.

In 2013, Forship Integrated Management System was granted certifications (ISO 9001, ISO 14001, and OSHAS 18001) by DNV.

Portfolio
Commissioning
 Operation & Maintenance & Changes
 Construction & Assembly
 Regulatory Support
 Owner's Engineering
 Banks Engineering
 HMSWeb – licensing a commissioning management system

Companies
 Forship Engenharia S.A., head office in Rio de Janeiro
 Forship International B.V., in Amsterdam
 Forship Asia Pte. Ltd., in Singapore
 Forship Mozambique Lda, in Maputo
 HMSWeb Tecnologia da Informação, in Rio de Janeiro

References

External links

 Sociedade Brasileira de Engenharia Naval (SOBENA) Webpage
 Instituto Brasileiro do Petróleo (IBP) Webpage 
 Centro de Excelência em EPC Webpage

Engineering companies of Brazil
Companies based in Rio de Janeiro (city)
Companies established in 1998
Oilfield services companies
Brazilian brands